Benin took part in the 2008 Summer Olympics which were held in Beijing, China from 8 to 24 August 2008. The country's participation at Beijing marked its eighth consecutive appearance in the summer Olympics since its debut in 1972, and its ninth Olympic appearance ever. The Benin delegation included five athletes in 2008, participating in three sports: athletics, swimming and taekwondo. Fabienne Feraez, a sprinter, was selected as the flag bearer for the opening ceremony. None of the Benin athletes progressed further than the heat round.

Background
Benin participated in eight summer Olympic games between its debut in the 1972 Summer Olympics in Munich and the 2008 Summer Olympics in Beijing. Competing under the name Dahomey, Benin made their Olympic debut in 1972, sending two athletes to the games. The most number of Benin athletes participating in a summer games, is 16 in the 1980 games in Moscow. Five athletes from Benin were selected to compete in the 2008 games: track and field athletes Fabienne Feraez and Mathieu Gnanligo; swimmers Alois Dansou and Gloria Koussihouede; and taekwondo practitioner Jean Moloise Ogoudjobi. Benin was also the first to arrive and raise their flag at the Olympic Village.

Athletics

Men's competition
A bronze medalist at the 2007 All-Africa Games, Mathieu Gnanligo, participated in the 400 meters. Gnanligo's appearance in Beijing marked his first appearance at any Olympic games. Once at the Olympics, Gnanligo was placed in the seventh heat on 18 August. He ran a time of 47.10 seconds and finished seventh in the heat against seven other athletes. He finished 49th out of 55 athletes, 6.01seconds ahead of the slowest athlete Xiaosheng Liu, and 2.31seconds behind the quickest athlete Chris Brown. He was 1.14seconds behind Andretti Bain, the slowest athlete who qualified for the semi-finals, and therefore did not progress.

Women's competition
Competing at her second Olympics, Fabienne Feraez was the oldest competitor for Benin, aged 32. She competed in the 200 meters on 19 August. Feraez, who also competed in the 2004 Summer Olympics, was drawn into heat three. Feraez ran a time of 24.07seconds and finished last in her heat, exactly asecond behind the winner, Marshevet Myers. She finished 40th out of 46 athletes overall and was 8.09seconds faster than the slowest athlete, Samia Yusuf Omar. Feraez was 1.36seconds behind the fastest athlete and 0.48seconds behind the slowest athlete who progressed to the semi-finals, Eleni Artymata.

Men

Women

Swimming

Men's competition
Alois Dansou competed in heat one of the 50 meters freestyle on August 14. Dansou also competed in the 2004 Summer Olympics, where he did not progress out of the heats. In 2008 Dansou repeated the result and failed to qualify for the semi-finals. He finished first in his heat in a time of 24.54seconds, ahead of Omar Jasim and Yasser Núñez. Overall he finished 62nd of 97 competitors and did not qualify for the semi-finals.

Women's competition
Benin had one woman competing in swimming at the 2008 Olympics. That athlete was Gloria Koussihouede who competed in the 50 meters freestyle. The 2008 Olympics was Koussihouedes second Olympics after competing in 2004, and she was selected to compete in heat one. Koussihouede finished second in her heat in a time of 37.09seconds, behind Sameera Al-Bitar and ahead of Pamela Girimbabazi Rugabira and Djene Barry. Her time placed her 87th out of 90 athletes and she did not qualify for the semi-finals.

Men

Women

Taekwondo

Men's competition
Benin had one taekwondo practitioner competing in the 2008 Olympics. This man was Jean Moloise Ogoudjobi, a 28-year-old Beninese athlete, competing at his first Olympic Games. Moloise Ogoudjobi fought in match three against Chutchawal Khawlaor from Thailand in the first round. Moloise Ogoudjobi lost and did not progress to the quarter-finals.

Men

See also
List of flag bearers for Benin at the Olympics
Benin National Olympic and Sports Committee

Notes

References

Nations at the 2008 Summer Olympics
2008
Olympics